Tino Caspanello is an Italian playwright, actor, set designer, and director.

Life
Tino Caspanello was born in Pagliara, Messina province, Italy. He graduated in Scenography at the Academy of Fine Arts Pietro Vannucci in Perugia. In 1993 he founded the theatre company Teatro Pubblico Incanto. He started to write plays in 1990. In 2003 his text Mari (The sea) received the Special Prize of the Jury of Premio Riccione. In 2008 Tino Caspanello received the prize of the National Association of Theatre Critics as playwright and director.

Original plays
Non siamo qui
Luna Park
Ballata
Era ottobre
Bar Stella
Santiago x
Sottotraccia
Don't cry Joe
Blues
Orli
Niño
Kyrie
Agnus
Quadri di una rivoluzione
Quasi notte
1 - 2 p. m.
1952 a Danilo Dolci
Interno
Terre
Sira
Fragile
Ecce homo
Nta ll'aria
Malastrada
Rosa
Mari : Special Jury Prize, Riccione Teatro Prize for Theater 2003

Publications
Santa, la guerra, novel, Edizioni La Gru, Latina, Italy 2022
Santiago x, translated by Pietro Pizzuti, anthology Recueil Festival volume 3, ed. Les oiseaux de nuit, Bruxelles, 2021
SINISLAR (Orli), translated by Senem Cevher, Mitos Boyut, Istanbul, 2021
Bounds (Orli), translated by Haun Saussy, Laertes Books Acting Editions, USA, 2020
Bords (Orli), translated by Antonella Capra and Stéphane Resche, anthology Frontières, PUM Presses Universitaires du Midi, France 2020
Bar Stella on Hystrio magazine, n. 3 - 2020, Italy
Devrimden Tablolar (Quadri di una rivoluzione) and Deniz (Mari), translated by Senem Cevher and Furkan Tekbıyık, Mitos Boyut, Istanbul, 2019
Dy Drama, (the book contains Det (Mari) and Tablo të një revolucioni (Quadri di una rivoluzione), translated by Arben Idrizi, Qendra Multimedia, Prishtine Kosovo, 2018 
Sottotraccia - Editoria & Spettacolo - Italy 2018 (the book contains: Sottotraccia, Orli, Blues, Niño, Don't cry Joe)
Salvo novel - Caracò Editore - Italy 2016
Polittico del silenzio - Editoria & Spettacolo - Italy 2016 (the book contains: Ecce Homo, Kyrie, Agnus)
Tableaux d'une révolution (Quadri di una rivoluzione), translated by Christophe Mileschi, PUM Presses Universitaires du Midi, France 2015
Quadri di una rivoluzione di Tino Caspanello, (the book contains: Quasi notte, Quadri di una rivoluzione, 1952 a Danilo Dolci, Terre, 1 - 2 p.m.), Editoria & Spettacolo - Italy 2013
Teatro di Tino Caspanello, (the book contains: Mari, Nta ll'aria, Malastrada, Rosa, Interno, Sira, Fragile), Editoria & Spettacolo, Italy 2012
A l'air libre (Nta ll'aria), translated by Julie Quénehen, Editions Espaces 34, France 2012
Mer (Mari), translated by Bruno and Frank La Brasca, Editions Espaces 34, France 2010
Malastrada on Hystrio magazine, n. 4 - 2010, Italy
Nta ll'aria in the anthology Senza Corpo, voci dalla nuova scena italiana, Minimum Fax, Italy 2009
Mari on Hystrio magazine, n. 2 - 2005, Italy

References

External links
web site dramma.it
web site dramma.it
web site Riccione Teatro
web site critikator.blogspot
web site Editoria & Spettacolo
web site Editions Espaces 34
web site Editions Espaces 34
web site Tino Caspanello
web site Teatro Pubblico Incanto

1960 births
Living people
Italian male actors
Italian dramatists and playwrights
Writers from Sicily